Ophiogomphus howei, the pygmy snaketail,  is a species of dragonfly in the family Gomphidae. It is endemic to the United States.  Its natural habitat is rivers.

Characteristics 
Pygmy snaketails are the smallest Ophiogomphus in North America, where the length of the abdomen is approximately 35 mm and hindwing is approximately 22 mm.

Life history 
The pygmy snaketail breed in streams and rivers. The nymphs emerge on mud banks or low vegetation that is close to the water’s edge in areas of the stream where the current is slower. The nymphs emerge over a 4 to 6 day period.

Habitat 
Pygmy snaketails live in medium to large fast-flowing rivers and streams. The surrounding areas are undisturbed forested areas with minimal agriculture. The nymphs live in the flowing water and will burrow into the substrate which is a trait common to species in Gomphidae.

Range 
Pygmy snaketail ranges are in two geographical areas in North America. The western population is found in the Great Lakes region in the northern half of Wisconsin. While the eastern population is located from New Brunswick, Canada to South Carolina, United States and the western most part reaching Kentucky. Within the range, they are discontinuous and found in localized areas along limited stretches of certain river systems.

Sources

References 

Insects of the United States
Ophiogomphus
Taxonomy articles created by Polbot
Insects described in 1924